Lockjaw is the second studio album by American rock band Dance Hall Crashers. Produced by the band themselves, Stoker and Rob Cavallo, the album was released on August 29, 1995, in the United States by (510) Records, an imprint of MCA Records.

Critical reception
{{Album ratings
| rev1 = AllMusic
| rev1Score = <ref name="am">{{cite web|author=Pemberton Roach|url=http://www.allmusic.com/album/lockjaw-mw0000645378|title=Review: Lockjaw'|publisher=Allmusic|date=|accessdate=January 30, 2014}}</ref>
}}
Pemberton Roach of AllMusic called Lockjaw a "wonderful reminder of the original spirit of ska-punk," elaborating that "Rather than celebrate the meathead/frat boy misogyny and overly simplistic anarchistic politics that have plagued a lot of "third-wave" ska and punk-pop, Dance Hall Crashers choose to throw a big ol' party." Trouser Press'' considered the album "a marvelous surge of mature and catchy power pop accented with punk juice and set — almost incidentally — to a breathless bluebeat."

Track listing

Personnel
Information adapted from liner notes.

Dance Hall Crashers
Elyse Rogers – vocals, management, production
Karina Deniké – vocals, production
Jason Hammon – guitar, gang vocals, production
Scott Goodell – guitar, gang vocals, production
Mikey Weiss – bass guitar, gang vocals, production
Gavin Hammon – drums, percussion, gang vocals, production

Additional musicians
Davey Havok – gang vocals

Production
Stoker – production
Rob Cavallo – production on "Enough"
Jeff Saltzman – A&R
Frank Rinella – recording engineer
Jerry Finn – mixing engineer
Neill King – recording engineer on "Enough"
Brian Gardner – mastering engineer
Bob Ludwig – mastering engineer on "Enough"

Artwork
"SCANO" – art direction, illustration
Dave Merkley – DHC logo

Charts

See also
1995 in music
Ska punk

Notes

External links
 

1995 albums
MCA Records albums
Dance Hall Crashers albums